Kennedy L. Potter was an American politician from the state of Michigan.

Career 
Potter was an alternate delegate to Republican National Convention from Michigan in 1924. He was Chairman of the Michigan Republican Party from 1925 to 1927.
Potter was the President of Jackson City Bank and Trust Company.

Personal life 
Potter was married. They had two children. Potter and his family lived in Jackson, Michigan.
On May 27, 1933, Potter died in a car accident when his car collided with a tractor-trailer parked on a highway. He was 55 years old.

References 

Year of birth missing
1933 deaths
Michigan Republican Party chairs
Michigan Republicans
Politicians from Jackson, Michigan